In applied mathematics, Gabor atoms, or Gabor functions, are functions used in the analysis proposed by Dennis Gabor in 1946 in which a family of functions is built from translations and modulations of a generating function.

Overview
In 1946, Dennis Gabor suggested the idea of using a granular system to produce sound. In his work, Gabor discussed the problems with Fourier analysis. Although he found the mathematics to be correct, it did not reflect the behaviour of sound in the world, because sounds, such as the sound of a siren, have variable frequencies over time. Another problem was the underlying supposition, as we use sine waves analysis, that the signal under concern has infinite duration even though sounds in real life have limited duration – see time–frequency analysis. Gabor applied ideas from quantum physics to sound, allowing an analogy between sound and quanta. He proposed a mathematical method to reduce Fourier analysis into cells. His research aimed at the information transmission through communication channels. Gabor saw in his atoms a possibility to transmit the same information but using less data. Instead of transmitting the signal itself it would be possible to transmit only the coefficients which represent the same signal using his atoms.

Mathematical definition
The Gabor function is defined by

where a and b are constants and g is a fixed function in L2(R), such that ||g|| = 1. This is similar to a wavelet system, which may form a basis through dilating and translating a mother wavelet.

When one takes

one gets the Gabor transform.

See also
Gabor filter
Gabor wavelet
Fourier analysis
Wavelet
Morlet wavelet

References

Further reading
Hans G. Feichtinger, Thomas Strohmer: "Gabor Analysis and Algorithms", Birkhäuser, 1998;   
Hans G. Feichtinger, Thomas Strohmer: "Advances in Gabor Analysis",  Birkhäuser,  2003; 
Karlheinz Gröchenig:  "Foundations of Time-Frequency Analysis", Birkhäuser,  2001;

External links
NuHAG homepage [Numerical Harmonic Analysis Group]

Wavelets
Fourier analysis